Death by Manipulation is a compilation album of EPs by British band Napalm Death. It was released on 19 August 1991.

Track listing

Tracks 1–4 are from the Mass Appeal Madness EP. Tracks 5–7 are from the "Suffer the Children" single. Tracks 8–13 are from the Mentally Murdered EP. Tracks 14–19 are from the Napalm Death/S.O.B. split 7-inch EP. Tracks 20–22 are from Live Corruption, recorded at the Salisbury Arts Centre on 30 June 1990. The Live Corruption tracks are only available on the United States edition.

Personnel

Tracks 1–7, 20–22
Mark "Barney" Greenway – lead vocals
Jesse Pintado – lead guitar
Mitch Harris – rhythm guitar
Shane Embury – bass
Mick Harris – drums, backing vocals

Tracks 8–19
Lee Dorrian – vocals
Bill Steer – guitars
Shane Embury – bass
Mick Harris – drums

References

Napalm Death compilation albums
1991 compilation albums